is a Japanese manga series written and illustrated by Masamichi Sato. It began serialization on Kodansha's Comic Days website in May 2020. As of October 2022, the series' individual chapters have been collected into eight volumes.

Publication
Written and illustrated by Masamichi Sato, the series began serialization on Kodansha's Comic Days manga website on May 30, 2020. As of October 2022, the series' individual chapters have been collected into eight tankōbon volumes.

In May 2021, Kodansha USA announced that they licensed the series for digital English publication. In July 2022, during their panel at Anime Expo, Kodansha USA announced the print release of the series.

Volume list

Reception
Yasushi Kobayashi from Da Vinci offered praise to the story, calling it intense. Masaki Endo from Tsutaya News also offered praise, calling it unique among other works of the isekai genre. The reviewer from  had similar feelings, calling the story fun.

References

External links
  
 

Isekai anime and manga
Japanese webcomics
Kodansha manga
Seinen manga
Webcomics in print